Waun Ki Hong (August 13, 1942 – January 2, 2019) was Professor of Medicine at The University of Texas MD Anderson Cancer Center, where he served as chairman of the Department of Thoracic/Head & Neck Medical Oncology from 1993 to 2005 and as head of the Division of Cancer Medicine from 2001 to 2014. He was also an American Cancer Society Professor and the Samsung Distinguished University Chair in Cancer Medicine emeritus.

Early life 
Waun Ki Hong was born in Korea, the sixth of seven children. He credits his brother Suk Ki Hong, MD, PhD, with stimulating his interest in a medical career. He graduated from Yonsei University College of Medicine in 1967, then served three years in the Korean Air Force. Hong migrated with his wife and family to the USA in 1970, where he worked several years as an intern and resident before taking up oncology.

Recognition in the field 
A national and international leader in medical oncology, he trained clinical oncologists throughout the world and participated in creating national cancer policy through the National Cancer Advisory Board (NCAB), the US FDA Oncologic Drug Advisory Committee, the NCI Board of Scientific Advisors, the American Society of Clinical Oncology Board of Directors, and as past president of the American Association for Cancer Research. He was an elected member of the Institute of Medicine (IOM) of the National Academies and an elected Inaugural Fellow of the American Association for Cancer Research (AACR) Academy.

Death 
He died at his home in California on January 2, 2019, at the age of 76.

Research interests 
Hong’s specialty was medical oncology, with expertise in the areas of molecular therapeutics, cancer prevention, clinical investigation, and personalized targeted therapy.

His research has affected the following areas:

Organ preservation 
Hong and his colleagues demonstrated the efficacy of combined chemotherapy and radiotherapy for laryngeal cancer without sacrificing the human larynx. He served as co-study chair for the Veterans Administration Cooperative laryngeal preservation trial, which affected the quality of life for advanced laryngeal cancer patients who previously had no other options except total removal of the voice box. This trial also served as a model for organ preservation in many other cancers such as bladder, breast, and anus.

Chemoprevention 
Hong demonstrated that high-dose retinoids can reverse oral carcinogenesis—a proof of principle that has led to additional ongoing studies in the area of cancer chemoprevention.

Personalized targeted therapy 
Hong initiated a translational research program at MD Anderson Cancer Center using molecularly-targeted approaches for the treatment of lung cancer. He led the BATTLE (Biomarker-integrated Approaches of Targeted Therapy for Lung Cancer Elimination) trial, which was the first successful prospective randomized trial based on the analysis of molecular findings from real-time biopsies to assign individualized targeted treatment. This trial laid out the groundwork for worldwide development of personalized targeted treatments through the use of tumor profiling.

Background 
Hong has played a role in shaping public policy in the United States through his service as chair of the Prevention, Clinical and Therapeutic Subcommittee for the National Cancer Institute (NCI) External Board of Scientific Advisors (BSA); the NCI Translational Research Working Group (TRWG); the U.S. FDA Oncologic Drug Advisory Committee (ODAC); and as chair of the Subcommittee of Clinical Investigations for the National Cancer Advisory Board (NCAB).

His contributions to cancer research have been recognized through national and international awards, including the Raymond Bourgine Award and the Claude Jacquillat Award from the International Congress on Anti-Cancer Treatment (ICACT) in France and the Ho-Am Prize from the Samsung Foundation in Korea. From the AACR, he received the Joseph A. Burchenal and Rosenthal Foundation Awards and the AACR/Cancer Research and Prevention Foundation Award for Excellence in Cancer Prevention Research. From the American Society of Clinical Oncology (ASCO) he received the David Karnofsky Award and the American Cancer Society Award. He also was selected to serve as a member of the ASCO Board of Directors. In 2012, he received the American Cancer Society Medal of Honor for Outstanding Clinical Research.

Hong obtained his medical degree from the Yonsei University School of Medicine, Korea, and completed his medical residency at the Boston Veterans Affairs (VA) Medical Center, followed by a fellowship at Memorial Sloan-Kettering Cancer Center.  He served as Chief of Medical Oncology at the Boston VA Medical Center and was a faculty member at both the Boston University School of Medicine and the Tufts University School of Medicine before joining MD Anderson Cancer Center in 1984. He is a Diplomate of the American Board of Internal Medicine (ABIM) in Medical Oncology, and a past member of the Subspecialty Board on Medical Oncology.

Publications and books 
Hong has authored more than 685 articles in scientific journals and edited 11 books. He was a founding editor of Head and Neck Cancer: A Multidisciplinary Approach and editor-in-chief of Holland-Frei Cancer Medicine, 8th Edition. He has served on the editorial boards of 17 scientific journals.

Selected peer-reviewed original research articles 
 Zhang J, Fujimoto J, Zhang J, Wedge DC, Song X, Zhang J, Seth S, Chow CW, Cao Y, Gumbs C, Gold KA, Kalhor N, Little L, Mahadeshwar H, Moran C, Protopopov A, Sun H, Tang J, Wu X, Ye Y, William WN, Lee JJ, Heymach JV, Hong WK, Swisher S, Wistuba II, Futreal PA. Intratumor heterogeneity in localized lung adenocarcinomas delineated by multiregion sequencing. Science 346(6206):256-9, 2014.
 Kadara H, Shen L, Fujimoto J, Saintigny P, Chow CW, Lang W, Chu Z, Garcia M, Kabbout M, Fan YH, Behrens C, Liu DA, Mao L, Lee JJ, Gold KA, Wang J, Coombes KR, Kim ES, Hong WK, Wistuba II.  Characterizing the molecular  spatial and temporal field of injury in early stage smoker non-small cell lung  cancer patients after definitive surgery by expression profiling.  Cancer Prev Res  (Phila) 6(1):8-17, 2013.
 Wu X, Ye Y, Rosell R, Amos CI, Stewart DJ, Hildebrandt MAT, Roth JA, Minna JD, Gu J, Lin J, Buch SC, Nukui T, Ramirez Serrano JL, Taron M, Cassidy A, Lu C, Chang JY, Lippman SM, Hong WK, Spitz MR, Romkes M, Yang P.  Genome-wide association study of survival in non-small cell lung cancer patients receiving platinum-based chemotherapy. J Natl Cancer Inst 103: 817-825, 2011.
 
 Gold KA, Kim ES, Lee JJ, Wistuba II, Farhangfar CJ, Hong WK. The BATTLE to Personalize Lung Cancer Prevention through Reverse Migration. Cancer Prev Res (Phila). 4(7):962-72, 2011
 
 CycKies MS, Holsinger FC, Lee JJ, William WN, Glisson BS, Lin HY, Lewin JS, Ginsberg LE, Gillaspy KA, Massarelli E, Byers L, Lippman SM, Hong WK, El-Naggar AK, Garden AS, Papadimitrakopoulou V.  Induction chemotherapy and cetuximab for locally advanced squamous cell carcinoma of the head and neck: results from a phase II prospective trial. J Clin Oncol 28(1): 8-14, 2010.
 
 Papadimitrakopoulou V, Izzo JG, Liu DD, Myers J, Ceron TL, Lewin J, William WN, Atwell A, Lee JJ, Gillenwater A, El-Naggar A, Wu X, Lippman SM, Hittelman WN, Hong WK. Cyclin D1 and cancer development in laryngeal premalignancy patients. Cancer Prev Res (Phila) 2(1):14-21, 2009.
 
 Spitz MR, Hong WK, Amos CI, Wu X, Schabath MB, Dong Q, Shete S, Etzel CJ. A risk model for prediction of lung cancer. J Natl Cancer Inst 99(9):715-26, 2007.
 
 Hong WK, Spitz MR, Lippman SM. Cancer chemoprevention in the 21st century: genetics, risk modeling, and molecular targets. J Clin Oncol 18(21 Suppl):9S-18S, 2000.
 
 Hong WK, Lippman SM, Itri LM, Karp DD, Lee JS, Byers RM, Schantz SP, Kramer AM, Lotan R, Peters LJ, Dimery IW, Brown BW, Goepfert H. Prevention of second primary tumors with isotretinoin in squamous cell carcinoma of the head and neck. N Engl J Med 323:795-801, 1990.

References

 "The Department of Veterans Affairs Laryngeal Cancer Study Group.  Induction chemotherapy plus radiation compared with surgery plus radiation in patients with advanced laryngeal cancer. N Engl J Med 324:1685-90, 1991-Study Co-Chairman.
 "The Cancer War: A Major Advance." The New York Times, October 8, 1989.
 "13 cis retinoic acid in the treatment of oral leukoplakia." N Engl J Med 315:1501-h 5, 1986.
 "HEALTH; Scientists Say an Acne Drug Can Prevent a Type of Cancer. The New York Times, September 20, 1990.
 "VITAL SIGNS: REMEDIES; Green Tea Without the Taste of Old Socks. The New York Times, October 20, 1998.
 "Medicine: Cancer Shield: A way to block malignancies. Time Magazine, October 1, 1990.
 "The BATTLE Trial: Personalizing Therapy for Lung Cancer." Cancer Discovery 1(6):44-53, 2011.

External links 
 www.mdanderson.org

1942 births
2019 deaths
University of Texas faculty
Writers from Texas
Recipients of the Ho-Am Prize in Medicine
Members of the National Academy of Medicine